The Crowell–Bourne Farm is a historic 1775 farmhouse on West Falmouth Highway (Route 28A) in West Falmouth, Massachusetts.

The farm has been owned and operated by Salt Pond Areas Bird Sanctuaries since 1979. The property has 49 acres of fields and woods with walking trails, and is open to the public. The Shining Sea Bikeway crosses the property on a paved former railroad bed. Of interest is an old cattle tunnel which was for herding livestock under the former railroad tracks.

The farm was listed on the National Register of Historic Places in 1980, and included in the West Falmouth Village Historic District in 1998.

See also
National Register of Historic Places listings in Barnstable County, Massachusetts

References

1775 establishments in Massachusetts
Buildings and structures completed in 1775
Farms on the National Register of Historic Places in Massachusetts
Houses on the National Register of Historic Places in Barnstable County, Massachusetts
Falmouth, Massachusetts
Historic district contributing properties in Massachusetts
Farmhouses in the United States